Hejaz or Hijaz (literally "the barrier")  may refer to the:
Hejaz, a geological region in the Arabian peninsula
Hijaz Mountains, a mountain range

States
Sharifate of Mecca (968–1925), also known as 'Emirate of Mecca'
Habesh Eyalet (1554–1872), also known as 'Habesh and Hejaz' or the 'Ottoman Province of Abyssinia' 
Hejaz Vilayet (1872–1916), also known as 'Ottoman Hejaz'
Kingdom of Hejaz (1916–1925)
Kingdom of Nejd and Hejaz (1926–1932)

Others
 Hijaz or Hijaz Bhairav, a raga in Hindustani classical music
 Hijaz-Nahawand maqam, also known as Phrygian dominant scale
 1910 Hedjaz meteorite fall